

This is a list of the National Register of Historic Places listings in Southington, Connecticut.

This is intended to be a complete list of the properties and districts on the National Register of Historic Places in Southington, Connecticut, United States. The locations of National Register properties and districts for which the latitude and longitude coordinates are included below, may be seen in various online maps.

There are more than 400 properties and districts listed on the National Register in Hartford County, including 21 National Historic Landmarks. The 41 properties and districts located in the town of Southington are listed below, while the properties and districts in the remaining parts of the county are listed separately. The Farmington Canal-New Haven and Northampton Canal, Hubbard Park, and the Marion Historic District extend into other communities in Hartford County and appear in both lists.

Twenty-five early houses in Southington were covered in a Multiple Property Submission study in 1988, and are indicated by asterisks (*) here.

Current listings
Addresses are "Southington, CT" unless otherwise indicated.

|}

See also

List of National Historic Landmarks in Connecticut
National Register of Historic Places listings in Connecticut

References

 Southington